Eclectofusus dedonderi is a species of sea snail, a marine gastropod mollusk in the family Buccinidae, the true whelks.

Description
The length of the shell attains 12 mm.

Distribution
This marine species occurs off the Balicasag Island, the Philippines.

References

 Fraussen K. & Stahlschmidt P. (2013) Eclectofusus, a new genus for Pararetifusus dedonderi Fraussen & Hadorn, 2006 [sic] (Gastropoda: Buccinidae). Novapex 14(2): 39-41

External links
 

Buccinidae